The 1994–95 Regionalliga season was the first year of the Regionalliga as the third tier of German football. There were four regional sections, Nord, Nordost, West-Südwest and Süd, each with eighteen teams. Most teams qualified from the Oberliga, which dropped to become a fourth-tier league, while five teams were relegated from the previous year's 2. Bundesliga. In the Nord section, four teams were promoted from the formerly fourth-tier Verbandsliga.

The four regional champions were all promoted directly to the 2. Bundesliga. The four runners-up entered the Amateur Championship, which was not a promotion playoff. Twelve teams were relegated, although the amount per region varied depending on the teams relegated from the second tier.

This was the last season of two points for a win, before it was increased to three.

Regionalliga Nord
The Regionalliga Nord covered the states of Bremen, Hamburg, Lower Saxony and Schleswig-Holstein.

Teams
The division largely replaced the Oberliga Nord, with fourteen of the teams qualifying directly from that division. FC Bremerhaven, SC Concordia, Lüneburger SK and SV Wilhelmshaven all earned promotion from the Verbandsliga.

Final table

Top scorers

Regionalliga Nordost
The Regionalliga Nordost covered the states of Berlin, Brandenburg, Mecklenburg-Vorpommern, Saxony, Saxony-Anhalt and Thuringia. This amounts to the former East Germany, as well as West Berlin.

Teams
Tennis Borussia Berlin and Carl Zeiss Jena were relegated from the 2. Bundesliga, while the remaining 16 teams came from the NOFV-Oberliga.

 BSV Brandenburg, EFC Stahl, FC Berlin, FSV Optik Rathenow, Reinickendorfer Füchse, Spandauer SV and BFC Türkiyemspor from the NOFV-Oberliga Nord
 Energie Cottbus, Hertha BSC (A), Hertha Zehlendorf, FSV Lok Altmark Stendal and 1. FC Union Berlin from the NOFV-Oberliga Mitte
 Bischofswerdaer FV, Erzgebirge Aue, Rot-Weiß Erfurt and FC Sachsen Leipzig  from the NOFV-Oberliga Süd

Final table

Top scorers

Regionalliga West/Südwest
The Regionalliga West/Südwest covered the states of North Rhine-Westphalia, Rhineland Palatinate and Saarland.

Teams
 Rot-Weiß Essen and Wuppertaler SV were relegated from the 2. Bundesliga
 Alemannia Aachen, 1. FC Bocholt, Bonner SC, and SCB Preußen Köln came from the Oberliga Nordrhein
 Borussia Neunkirchen, SV Edenkoben, Eintracht Trier, SC Hauenstein, FSV Salmrohr and VfB Wissen from the Oberliga Südwest
 Arminia Bielefeld, SpVgg Erkenschwick, TuS Paderborn-Neuhaus, Preußen Münster, SC Verl and SG Wattenscheid 09 (A) from the Oberliga Westfalen

Final table

Top scorers

Regionalliga Süd
The Regionalliga Süd covered the states of Baden-Württemberg, Bavaria and Hessen.

Teams
 Stuttgarter Kickers were relegated from the 2. Bundesliga
 TSF Ditzingen, SpVgg Ludwigsburg, VfR Mannheim, SSV Reutlingen, SSV Ulm 1846 came from the Oberliga Baden-Württemberg
 FC Augsburg, Bayern Munich (A), SpVgg Fürth, SV Lohhof, SpVgg Unterhaching, TSV Vestenbergsgreuth from the Bayernliga
 SV Darmstadt 98, SG Egelsbach, Hessen Kassel, Kickers Offenbach, Rot-Weiß Frankfurt and SV Wehen from the Oberliga Hessen

Final table

Top scorers

External links
 Regionalliga Nord 1994–95  at kicker.de
 Regionalliga Nordost 1994–95  at kicker.de
 Regionalliga West/Südwest 1994–95  at kicker.de
 Regionalliga Süd 1994–95  at kicker.de

1994-95
3
Germ